Sema Aydemir (born 17 August 1985) is a Turkish female sprinter, who is specializes in the 400m hurdles event.

In her early years she competed in the heptathlon event. Sema Apak qualified for participation in the 4 × 400 m relay event at the 2012 Summer Olympics.

Her personal best time in the 400m hurdles is 56.62 scored 2012 in Ankara, Turkey.

She is married to Olympic bronze medalist hammer thrower Eşref Apak. The couple has a son named Ali. They divorced in 2016 by agreement.

At the 2013 Islamic Solidarity Games held in Palembang, Indonesia, she won a gold medal in the 4x100 event with teammates Saliha Özyurt, Birsen Engin and Nimet Karakuş, a silver medal in the 4x400 event with teammates Özge Akın, Birsen Engin and Esma Aydemir as well as a bronze medal in the long jump event.

Achievements

References

External links
 

1985 births
Sportspeople from Bursa
Living people
Turkish female heptathletes
Turkish female sprinters
Turkish female hurdlers
Enkaspor athletes
Athletes (track and field) at the 2012 Summer Olympics
Olympic athletes of Turkey
Mediterranean Games silver medalists for Turkey
Athletes (track and field) at the 2013 Mediterranean Games
Mediterranean Games medalists in athletics
Survivor Turkey contestants
Islamic Solidarity Games competitors for Turkey
20th-century Turkish sportswomen
21st-century Turkish sportswomen